The 2010 Illinois Fighting Illini football team represented the University of Illinois at Urbana–Champaign in the 2010 NCAA Division I FBS football season. The Fighting Illini, led by sixth-year head coach Ron Zook, are members of the Big Ten Conference and played their home games at Memorial Stadium. They finished the season 7–6, 4–4 in Big Ten play and were invited to the Texas Bowl where they defeated Baylor 38–14.

Schedule

References

Illinois
Illinois Fighting Illini football seasons
Texas Bowl champion seasons
Illinois Fighting Illini football